Ubiale Clanezzo is a comune (municipality) in the Province of Bergamo in the Italian region of Lombardy, located about  northeast of Milan and about  northwest of Bergamo.  
 
Ubiale Clanezzo borders the following municipalities: Almenno San Salvatore, Brembilla, Capizzone, Sedrina, Strozza, Villa d'Almè. Sights include the castle (rebuilt in the 18th century) and the Bridge of Attone, which spans the Imagna torrent.

References